"Got to Get You Off My Mind" is a 1965 soul single written and performed by Solomon Burke. The single was produced by Jerry Wexler, and was the most successful of Burke's long career, becoming his highest-charting single on both the R&B and pop singles charts. "Got to Get You Off My Mind" was number one on Billboard's R&B Singles chart for three weeks and made the Top 40 on the pop singles chart.

Background
Burke recorded the song, one of four, during a recording session on January 22, 1965. The song was written by Burke, his second wife Delores (by then mother of 11 of his children) and his mother Josephine Burke Moore. It was started on 11 December 1964, just hours after Burke heard that his friend Sam Cooke had been murdered. Burke explained the origin of "Got to Get You Off My Mind": “It was written in California the night of Sam Cooke’s death. I learned of Sam Cooke’s death after leaving him two hours prior to that. At the same time I learned about my wife wanting a divorce. A special delivery letter was at the desk waiting for me in the hotel... so all of these things came about very quickly and very drastically.” Burke completed the song on the train back to Chicago for Cooke's funeral.

Chart positions

Personnel
Producer: Jerry Wexler, Bert Berns
Lead vocals: Solomon Burke
Vocal group: The Sweet Inspirations
Background vocals: Estelle Brown, Sylvia Shemwell, Cissy Houston, Dee Dee Warwick
Bass: David Adams
Drums: Panama Francis
Guitar: Bob Bushnell, Bill Suyker, Eric Gale
Piano: Ernie Hayes
Trumpet: Bill Berry, Ernie Royal
Bass trombone: Tony Studd
Tenor saxophone: Charlie Brown, Sam Taylor
Baritone saxophone: Seldon Powell
Arrangements: Gene Page
Conductor: Gene Page

See also
List of number-one R&B singles of 1965 (U.S.)

References

External links
 "Got To Get You Off My Mind / Peepin'" at discogs.com

1965 singles
Rhythm and blues songs
Solomon Burke songs
Song recordings produced by Jerry Wexler
Songs written by Solomon Burke
1965 songs
Atlantic Records singles